Shender Shami (also Romanized as Shender Shāmī) is a village in Gharbi Rural District, in the Central District of Ardabil County, Ardabil Province, Iran. At the 2006 census, its population was 176 people spread over 33 families.

References 

Towns and villages in Ardabil County